Qanat-e Now (also Romanized as Qanāt-e Now and Qanāt Now; also known as Mahtābī, Qanāt-e Now Pā’īn, Qanāt Now-e Pā’īn, and Qanāt Now Pā’īn) is a village in Jahadabad Rural District, in the Central District of Anbarabad County, Kerman Province, Iran. At the 2006 census, its population was 108, in 20 families.

References 

Populated places in Anbarabad County